Senator Dato' Arman Azha bin Abu Hanifah (born 12 December 1975), also known as Armand Azha Abu Hanifah, is a Malaysian politician from the United Malays National Organization. He was appointed as a Member of the Senate of Malaysia on October 26, 2021. At the party level, he is a Member of the UMNO Supreme Council and the Head of UMNO Subang Division.

Early life and education 
He obtained a Master of Political Science from the University College of Geomatics, Kuala Lumpur in 2017. He is active in sports, especially cycling, running and swimming. He used to cycle from Kuala Lumpur to Langkawi for more than 500 km in 2020 in conjunction with the Rapha 500 Festival.

Business 
He is also a businessman involved in the cyber security technology industry and is a director of Asia Coding Center Sdn Bhd.

Politics 
He has held several positions in UMNO, including as Exco of the Malaysian UMNO Youth Movement in 2013 to 2018. He is also the first head of the youth wing (Chief Hero) of the Perkasa Malaysia Indigenous Organization, who served from 2009 to 2010.

Health 
Arman was once confirmed positive for COVID-19 on January 4, 2021.

Honour 
  :
 Knight Companion of the Order of the Crown of Pahang (DIMP) – Dato' (2015)

References 

1975 births
Living people
Malaysian people of Malay descent
Malaysian Muslims
United Malays National Organisation politicians
Members of the Dewan Negara
21st-century Malaysian politicians